The Oullim Spirra is a sports car manufactured by Oullim Motors, a subsidiary of Oullim Networks. The company headquarters are located in Yangjae-dong in downtown Seoul while the production facility is located in Kyunggi-do province just south of Seoul. Oullim Motors was co-founded in 2007 by former Ssangyong Motors designer Han-chul Kim and Dong-hyuk Park, the founder and CEO of Oullim Networks.

The Spirra had been in production from 2008 to 2017, and was available in various countries including China, United Arab Emirates, Malaysia and the Netherlands.

Introduction
The initial conception of a Korean exotic sports car was envisioned by Han-chul Kim in the mid 1990s, then a designer at SsangYong Motors. Upon the inception of a tangible vision, Kim quit Ssangyong Motors to further pursue the dream of building a sports car and founded Proto Motors with his wife, a researcher at Asia Motors.

This engine was from the 1999/2001 Ford Mustang SVT Cobra. A prototype, developed to compete as a competent sports car, was codenamed the PS-II and revealed to the public for the first time at the 2000 Seoul Motor Show. The PS-II was renamed the Spirra before being debuted at the 2004 Beijing Motor Show. Initial production attempts failed due to insufficient funds and the project was delayed indefinitely.

The production of the Spirra became feasible when Kim coincidentally met Dong-hyuk Park, an ardent car enthusiast and successful IT entrepreneur. Park had established Oullim Networks Inc, a firm specializing in internet securities. He also founded Oullim Motors, a subsidiary of the Oullim conglomerate concentrating on the development, design and innovation of motor vehicles. In 2007, Proto Motors was acquired by Oullim Motors with Kim as chief of development, and under new management the Spirra project was rejuvenated after five years of stagnation.

Production models
The Spirra lineup consisted of four different trims under the names Spirra N, Spirra S, Spirra Turbo and Spirra EX. All engines before CregiT are based on the DOHC 2656 cc V6 Delta engine. These engines undergo extensive calibrations and modifications for increased performance, power and responsiveness suitable for applications requiring such characteristics.

All of Spirra CregiT used DOHC 3778 cc V6 Lambda RS engine.

Specifications of the Spirra (Iconic, N, S, T, EX Models)

Spirra EX
 0–100 km/h(62 mph) – 3.5s
 Top speed – 
 Curb weight(dry) – 
 Max. power (SAE net) – 
 Max. torque –

Spirra T
 0–100 km/h(62 mph) – 3.8s
 Top speed – 
 Curb weight(dry) – 
 Max. power (SAE net) – 
 Max. torque –

Spirra S
 0–100 km/h(62 mph) – 4.6s
 Top speed – 
 Curb weight(dry) – 
 Max. power (SAE net) – 
 Max. torque –

Spirra N
 0–100 km/h(62 mph) – 6.8s
 Top speed – 
 Curb weight(dry) – 
 Max. power (SAE net) – 
 Max. torque –

Spirra Iconic
 0–100 km/h(62 mph) – 4.6s
 Top speed – 
 Curb weight(dry) – 
 Max. power (SAE net) – 
 Max. torque –

Spirra CregiT N
 0–100 km/h(62 mph) – 4.4s
 Top speed – 
 Curb weight(dry) – N.A
 Max. power (SAE net) – 
 Max. torque –

Spirra CregiT Turbo
 0–100 km/h(62 mph) – 4.0s
 Top speed – 
 Curb weight(dry) – N.A
 Max. power (SAE net) – 
 Max. torque –

Spirra CregiT EX
 0–100 km/h(62 mph) – 3.5s
 Top speed – 
 Curb weight(dry) – N.A
 Max. power (SAE net) – 
 Max. torque – 

Pricing: (Variable, depending on market location)

 $74,000 - $175,000 [U.S Dollars]

Electric Spirra

An all-electric variant of the Spirra was in development, similar to the likes of the Tesla Roadster. Relying primarily on electricity, the vehicle was co-developed by a Dutch company known as Electric Power Holland; they were also the sole dealer of Spirras in the European Union and subsequently had exclusive rights to develop the car.

Specifications for the Spirra E were not available, but unverified sources claimed a top speed of 125 mph [201 km/h], a 0-62 mph time of 5.3 seconds, and a maximum cruising range of 120 miles [200 km]

Racing
The racing version of the Spirra was designed to compete in the KGTM tour. The V6 2.7 24V Twin Turbo engine has been further tweaked to produce  and reach 338 km/h (211 mph). The team won its debut race at Yongin Speedway in the 2008 Extra Time Trial and took 1st place in the 2008 series. Competent race cars such as the BMW M3 GTR, Porsche GT3 RSR and Nismo 350Z were participants in the KGTM tour.

See also
 Hyundai Genesis Coupe
 Hyundai Genesis

References

Automotive industry in South Korea
Companies based in Seoul
Vehicle manufacturing companies established in 2007
South Korean brands
2010s cars
Mid-engined vehicles
Rear-wheel-drive vehicles
Sports cars
Coupés